The Gilbert Building, also known as the Jacobs Building and Taylor Hotel, is a historic building located in downtown Portland, Oregon listed on the National Register of Historic Places.

See also
 National Register of Historic Places listings in Southwest Portland, Oregon

References

Further reading

External links
 

1893 establishments in Oregon
Commercial buildings completed in 1893
National Register of Historic Places in Portland, Oregon
Portland Historic Landmarks
Romanesque Revival architecture in Oregon
Southwest Portland, Oregon